The Rex Theater is a theater in Port-au-Prince, Haiti, that was opened in October, 1935.
It was built by the Société Haïtienne des Spectacles (Haitian Entertainment Corporation), led by Daniel Brun.  The theater seated 1200 people and was managed by Mrs. Muffat Taldy until 1951.

Cultural events
The Rex has been the site of many cultural and entertainment events. In its first week, the Rex Theater screened films that included La Bataille (The Battle), La Robe Rouge (The Red Dress), Gai Divorce (The Gay Divorcee), and Banque Nemo (Nemo's Bank), and its first play was performed in April 1937. 
A performance at the Rex was given by Marian Anderson.

Political events
On various occasions events at the Rex have had a political focus or political implications. For example, on 20 December 1945, as the first of a planned series of twelve lectures, the poet André Breton spoke at the Rex on "Surréalisme". Upon completing his lecture, which was attended by six hundred students as well as the president of Haiti and many of his ministers, senators and deputies, and some military dignitaries and business people,

Many years later, in 2001, the Rex was the planned site of an opposition political event. The Rex Theater had been the initially planned site for the "inauguration" of Gérard Gourgue as an "alternative president". However, "the theater's management, fearful of popular outrage, canceled the event".

References

External links
"Rex Théatre, un patrimoine à sauvegarder" (Youtube) ("Rex Théatre, a heritage to be preserved")
Rex Theater at Cinema Treasures

Theatres in Haiti
Cinemas in Haiti
Buildings and structures completed in 1935
Buildings and structures in Port-au-Prince
Theatres completed in 1935